The Morning Telegraph  (1839 – April 10, 1972) (sometimes referred to as the New York Morning Telegraph) was a New York City broadsheet newspaper owned by Moe Annenberg's Cecelia Corporation. It was first published as the Sunday Mercury from 1839 to 1897 and became The Morning Telegraph in December, 1897.

The paper was devoted mostly to theatrical and horse racing news. It published a Sunday edition as the Sunday Telegraph. On closing, it was replaced by an Eastern edition of Triangle's sister publication, the Daily Racing Form.

References

Newspapers established in 1839
Publications disestablished in 1972
Defunct newspapers published in New York City
Horse racing in the United States
1839 establishments in New York (state)
1972 disestablishments in New York (state)
Daily newspapers published in New York City